André Liautaud (October 1, 1906 – July 26, 1951) was a Haitian diplomat and politician.

From 1925 to 1928, he was director of a farm school.
From 1928 to 1938, he was assistant director of rural education.
From 1938 to 1941, he was commissioner general for a land settlement project.
From 1941 to 1942, he was director of rural education.
In 1942, he was under-secretary of finance, commerce and industry.
On  the legation was upgraded to embassy.
From February to March 1945 he was delegate to the Pan-American Conference on the Problems of War and Peace, in Chapultepec. 
From April 25, 1945, to June 26, 1945, he participated on the United Nations Conference on International Organization in San Francisco.
From October 30, 1945, to January 11, 1946 ,he was Haitian Minister of Public Health in Port-au-Prince.

References

1906 births
1951 deaths
Ambassadors of Haiti to the United States
Teachers College, Columbia University alumni